Jak and Daxter: The Precursor Legacy is a 2001 platform video game developed by Naughty Dog and published by Sony Computer Entertainment for the Sony PlayStation 2 on December 3, 2001, as the first game of the Jak and Daxter series.

The game follows the protagonist, a young teenager named Jak, as he tries to help his friend Daxter after he is transformed into an ottsel, a fictional hybrid of an otter and a weasel. With the help of Samos the Sage, a master of the mysterious energy called 'Eco' created by an ancient race known as the Precursors, the pair learn that they must save their world from the rogue sages Gol and Maia Acheron, who plan to flood the world with "Dark Eco", a mysterious substance which corrupts all it touches.

The game offers a large range of missions, collectibles and objectives often in the form of minigames which provide a variety of gameplay experiences, as well as puzzles and platforming stages which are completed by the player to proceed the story. The title is often credited as being one of the first games with 'no' loading screens, with players able to traverse from the starting location to the final battle, and all interconnected levels in-between, without breaking away from gameplay.

Development began in January 1999, following the fourth installment of Naughty Dog's Crash Bandicoot franchise for the PlayStation. Jak and Daxter received critical acclaim upon release with most critics praising the game's variety. Many critics agreed that the game had some of the best-looking graphics at the time of its release. By 2002, the game had sold a total of over one million copies worldwide, and by 2007, it had sold two million in the United States alone.

In 2012, it was one of the remastered ports in the Jak and Daxter Collection for the PlayStation 3, and for the PlayStation Vita in 2013. It was released as a "PS2 Classic" port for the PlayStation 4 on 22 August 2017, the same day as the release of Uncharted: The Lost Legacy. In 2022, a PC port   was released by fans.

Gameplay 
Jak and Daxter: The Precursor Legacy is a 3D platformer in which the objective is to gather items to progress through the levels. The player controls Jak, who has access to abilities such as double jumping, a rapid spinning kick, and glide punching. Injuries are accounted for by way of a life meter, which decreases whenever Jak is hit by enemies, falls from long distances, or makes contact with hazardous surfaces.

The Precursor Legacy offers several collectibles for the player to gather. The main objects are power cells, which are used to energize machinery to reach new levels. Power cells can be earned in many ways, such as fighting enemies, performing tasks for other characters, completing platforming challenges, and paying for them via Precursor orbs. Precursor orbs are egg-shaped collectables found scattered throughout the world, some in plain sight, and some hidden. Another collectible, scout flies, appear on every level. Collecting all seven scout flies in a level rewards the player with a power cell.

A large part of the gameplay revolves around eco, a type of colored mysterious energy that comes in six different forms. The player is able to utilize eco powers by either collecting small amounts of glowing eco particles or fully charging through eco vents. Green eco, the most common of the six types of eco, restores health. Blue eco increases Jak's speed; breaks nearby boxes (except strong boxes); attracts Precursor orbs, scout flies, and small clusters of blue and green eco towards him; and activates certain machinery. Red eco increases attack power, while yellow eco allows the player to shoot ranged bursts of energy through Jak's hands. Dark eco also exists in the game, but as an obstacle that damages Jak, rather than an item that is collected. Light eco is also used exclusively in the game's final boss battle.

The game contains three bosses whose defeat earns the player power cells or allows the player some method of progressing further in the game. However, not all bosses are mandatory. The first boss, the dark eco plant, is only defeated in order to gain a power cell and to remove hazardous spiked tentacles from the jungle area. The second boss, a cyborg Lurker named Klaww, must be defeated in order to enter the Mountain Pass. To do so, players must collect enough power cells to utilize a levitation device and unblock a path, allowing access to him. Once he is defeated, the areas beyond his lair are accessible. The final boss is an ancient giant robot, which has been restored to working order by the game's villains, Gol and Maia. Defeating the robot is the final task in the game; once it has been defeated, the end cutscene plays.

Plot

Setting 

The game is set on a fictional planet incorporating fantasy elements, which consists of small and not very technologically advanced settlements, surrounded by varying environments and abandoned ruins. One major hub is Sandover Village, home of the two protagonists: Jak, a mute 15-year-old teenager, and his best friend, Daxter (Max Casella), a loudmouth who is transformed at the beginning of the game into a fictional hybrid of an otter and a weasel, called an ottsel.

Eco is a type of energy which dominates the world and was created by an ancient race of beings known only as "Precursors", implied by Samos Hagai (Warren Burton) at the beginning to be the masters of the universe and creators of all life on the planet. The two boys live with Samos, the Sage of green eco, and father of Keira (Anna Garduño), who is implied to be Jak's love interest. She builds the flying Zoomer vehicle that Jak and Daxter use multiple times throughout their adventure.

The primary enemies of the game consist of beasts known as "Lurkers" led by the antagonists Gol Acheron, the Dark Sage (Dee Snider), and his sister, Maia (Jennifer Hagood), who have been turned evil by the effects of the dark eco they studied. Their goal is to open a giant silo full of dark eco and use it to shape the universe to their liking. Other characters are the Blue (John Di Crosta), Red (Sherman Howard), and Yellow (Jason Harris) Sages, all of whom are masters of the eco from which they take their name.

Story 
Against Samos's warnings, Jak and Daxter make their way to the forbidden Misty Island. There, they see two unknown figures ordering the Lurkers to gather eco and Precursor artifacts. The duo, worried by what they are seeing, prepare to leave, but are soon discovered by a Lurker guard. Jak manages to kill it with an explosive device they found, but the resulting explosion sends Daxter into a pool of dark eco. He emerges transformed into an ottsel (a fictional hybrid of an otter and a weasel), but is otherwise unharmed. Returning to their home of Sandover Village, they seek help from Samos. Samos explains that only Gol Acheron, the Dark Sage, can reverse the transformation.

As Gol lives to the north, the boys look for a means of crossing the deadly Fire Canyon. Samos's beautiful daughter Keira, a skilled engineer, offers to let them use her Zoomer (essentially a hoverbike) in exchange for enough power cells to operate it. Jak and Daxter begin their training in a nearby island called Geyser Rock, where they collect a few cells. Then they return to Sandover Village and explore a neighboring jungle, a beach off the village's coast, and Misty Island (which is accessible via speedboat after helping a local fisherman). After collecting enough cells, the heroes make their way through the Fire Canyon to Rock Village, the home of the Blue Sage. To their horror, the village has been attacked by a massive Lurker known as Klaww, and the Blue Sage has vanished. With the path forward blocked by Klaww, the boys look for more cells and explore an abandoned underwater Precursor city, an elevated basin filled with Precursor technology, and a swamp across the village bay. Using the collected cells, Keira clears the path, allowing Jak and Daxter to defeat Klaww, cross the Mountain Pass, and make their way into the ancient Volcanic Crater where the Red Sage dwells.

With the Red Sage missing as well, Samos sends the boys to hunt for enough cells so Keira can upgrade the Zoomer's heat shield. At this time, the truth is revealed: The Blue, Red, and Yellow Sages have been abducted by Gol and his sister Maia (who were also the figures Jak and Daxter saw on Misty Island), who intend to harness their combined power to extract the dark eco in their possession and use it to remake the world. However, Samos warns that if they open the silos containing the vast stores of dark eco deep underground, the dark eco will twist and destroy everything it touches. Jak and Daxter continue to look for more cells, exploring a dark cave filled with Lurker spiders and a mountainous tundra by the volcano's summit.

Making their way through the lava tunnels leading to Gol and Maia's citadel, the boys run into Keira, who reveals that Samos has also been captured. With the four Sages now under their control, the Acheron siblings begin restoring their excavated automaton so that they can release the dark eco from its silo. After rescuing the Sages from captivity, Jak and Daxter intercept the machine and engage it in battle. However, they only manage to destroy its eco weapons. Realizing that a greater power is needed to defeat Gol and Maia, Samos and the Blue, Red, and Yellow Sages combine the four different types of eco into one, creating light eco. Daxter contemplates using the light eco to return himself to normal, but ultimately allows Jak to use it instead.

Unable to escape the cockpit of their destroyed machine, Gol and Maia plunge into the silo and are presumed dead. With the world saved, the group focuses its attention on unlocking the fabled Precursor Door, which can only open with the energy of 100 power cells. Once the door is opened, it reveals a large, mysterious object enveloped in a blinding light. The object itself is kept a mystery until the second game.

Development 

Development on Jak and Daxter began in January 1999 as "Project Y". As the rest of the Naughty Dog team were working on Crash Team Racing, only two programmers were allocated to the project. The rest of the team began work on Jak as well after the release of the PlayStation 2; eventually 35 developers worked on the game. Because of the PS2's status as a new console, Naughty Dog felt they had to create a unique character for it. Before the main development of Jak and Daxter, Naughty Dog confirmed the idea with Sony Computer Entertainment, and after showing them a character they dubbed "Boxman" to demonstrate their animation engine, they came up with Jak and Daxter.

Jason Rubin stated in an interview with Play (US Magazine) that the 40 minutes of animation in the game required 6 full-time animators and 4 support animators. In some cases the animators came from outside of the video game industry from companies such as Disney and Nickelodeon.
 
The game was in development for almost three years, and throughout this time, numerous changes were made to almost every aspect of the game, while the various engines used in the game were all tweaked to optimize their performance. The engine tweaks allowed Jak and Daxter to have no loading times or fogging and be able to display high-quality textures in a seamless, multi-level world.

Due to each area of the game being 3–6 million polygons, the 3D computer graphics application Maya would stop working even on cutting-edge PCs. To combat this issue, the team had to use references and proxies as Maya and other current tools available were not capable of handling the entire area all at once.

The main characters also went through changes. Originally, there was going to be a third main character that would develop as the game was played in a Tamagotchi style. Instead, Naughty Dog concentrated their efforts on two main characters in order to create the exact characters they wanted. In an interview, Naughty Dog stated: "The character inspiration was more Joe Madureira who did Battle Chasers, the comic book, than anything else…" The game was announced at E3 2001. After the release of The Precursor Legacy, Naughty Dog was prepared to create a sequel as long as the first did well enough to warrant it. After the game did go on to sell admirably, development of Jak II was begun shortly thereafter.

The voice-acting was recorded in the New York City-based Howard Schwartz Recording facility. The game's soundtrack was composed entirely by multi-instrumentalist Josh Mancell. The album was produced by Devo's singer Mark Mothersbaugh and was recorded at Mutato Muzika Studios.

A Flash game was developed and released in 2001 to promote the game which was restored and made playable by archivists and fans of the Jak and Daxter series.

In 2022, a fan project called OpenGOAL was released which decompiles The Precursor Legacy and then recompiles it for x86-64, making it playable natively on PC.

Reception 

Jak and Daxter: The Precursor Legacy received "universal acclaim", according to review aggregator Metacritic. Before its release, SCEA gave IGN a demo build of Jak and Daxter. Douglass C. Perry, a member of IGN staff said, "…Jak and Daxter is a breath of fresh air, a funny, light-hearted, but no less epic action-adventure game all its own…" after reviewing the demo build for twelve hours. GameSpot gave a score of 8.8 out of 10, praising its tight execution and heavy action elements which "ensure that things never become dull," and continued, "Next to Rayman 2, Jak and Daxter is the best 3D platformer available for the PlayStation 2." Game Informer gave the game a high score of 9.25 out of 10, and also offered praise to its graphics and the absence of load times, saying: "On several occasions, I found myself staring in awe at the little details Naughty Dog so meticulously included." At the 2002 Game Developers Choice Awards, Daxter from Jak and Daxter: The Precursor Legacy won the Original Game Character of the Year award. It was a runner-up for GameSpot annual "Best Platform Game" award among console games, which went to Conker's Bad Fur Day.

After its release in late 2001, the game went on to sell over 1 million copies, promoting it to "Greatest Hits" and reducing the price. By July 2006, it had sold 1.7 million copies and earned $49 million in the United States, and had become the best-selling Jak and Daxter game in that country. Next Generation ranked it as the 19th highest-selling game launched for the PlayStation 2, Xbox, or GameCube between January 2000 and July 2006 in the United States. Combined sales of Jak and Daxter games reached 4 million units in the United States by July 2006. As of 2007, Jak and Daxter has sold almost 2 million copies (1.97 million) in the United States alone. Jak and Daxter received a "Gold Prize" in Japan for sales of over 500,000 units. The game is also the 17th best-selling game on the PlayStation 2.

References

External links

 

 

2001 video games
Jak and Daxter
Naughty Dog games
Platform games
PlayStation 2 games
PlayStation 2-only games
Single-player video games
Steampunk video games
Open-world video games
Video games developed in the United States
Video games scored by Josh Mancell
Video games set on fictional planets
3D platform games